Summer's End is the second studio album by the Dutch gothic metal band Autumn.

Track listing
"The Coven (The Witch in Me, Part II)" - 3:47
"Gospels in Dusk (The Witch in Me, Part III)" - 4:34
"Gallery of Reality" - 6:06
"Silent Madness" - 5:20
"Vision Red" - 5:54
"Lifeline" - 5:54
"This Night" - 4:07
"The Green Angel" - 5:51
"Whispering Secrets" - 4:27
"Summer's End" - 4:56
"Solar Wake" - 5:27

Bonus material
"Premeditated Dying" video

B-sides
"Premeditated Dying", available on the "Gallery of Reality" single.

Charts

References

External links
 Autumn official website

2004 albums
Autumn (band) albums